The total installed power generation capacity in India as on July 31, 2022 is 404,132.95 MW with sector wise & type wise break up as given below.

For the state wise installed power generation capacity, refer to States of India by installed power capacity.

Hydroelectric power plants with ≤ 25 MW generation capacity are included in Renewable category (classified as SHP - Small Hydro Project) .

The break up of renewable energy sources (RES) is: 
 Solar power (57,973.78 MW)
 Wind power (40,893.33 MW)
 Biomass/Cogeneration (10,205.61 MW)
 Small hydro (4,887.90 MW)
 Waste-to-energy (476.75 MW)

The following lists name many of the utility power stations in India.

Conventional

Nuclear power 

Nuclear power is the fifth-largest source of electricity in India after thermal, hydroelectric and renewable sources of electricity.  , India has 22 nuclear reactors in operation at seven sites, having an installed capacity of 6780 MW. and producing a total of 30,292.91 GWh of electricity 11 more reactors are under construction to generate an additional 8,100 MW.

All the twenty two nuclear power reactors with an installed capacity of 6,780 MW equal to 2.0% of total installed utility capacity, are operated by the Nuclear Power Corporation of India.
India ranked seventh in number of operated reactors (22) and fourteenth in total installed capacity.

$ → The retired/scrapped power stations.

Thermal power station 

Thermal power is the "largest" source of power in India. There are different types of thermal power plants based on the fuel that are used to generate the steam such as coal, gas, and diesel, natural gas. About 71% of electricity consumed in India is generated by thermal power plants.

Coal 
More than 62% of India's electricity demand is met through the country's vast coal reserves. Public sector undertaking National Thermal Power Corporation (NTPC) and several other state level power generating companies are engaged in operating coal-based thermal power plants. Apart from NTPC and other state level operators, some private companies also operate the power plants. One coal plant was given environmental clearance in 2021. Although new plants are unlikely to be built, if more coal is burnt in existing plants it will increase greenhouse gas emissions by India. Here is some list of operating coal-based thermal power plants in India.

$ → The retired/scrapped power stations.

Gas-based 
The total installed capacity of Natural gas based power plants in India, is nearly 24,991.51 MW. Here is a list of plants operating and waiting for natural gas to start operations.

$ → The retired/scrapped power stations.

Diesel-based 
The total installed capacity of major grid connected diesel-based power plants in India, is 509.71 MW. The installed capacity of captive power DG sets is estimated to be nearly 90,000 MW. Here is the part list of grid connected plants.

$ → The retired/scrapped power stations.

Renewable 

India was the first country in the world to set up a ministry of non-conventional energy resources, in the early 1980s. India's cumulative grid interactive, or grid tied, renewable energy capacity (excluding large hydro) has reached about 87.38 GW, as of 2020.

Hydroelectric 

This is a list of major hydroelectric power plants in India.

# Hydro power units with pumped storage features.

Solar Photovoltaic

Solar Thermal 
Listed are Concentrated solar power stations with a capacity of at least 10MW.

Wind power 

India has many large wind power production farms (10MW and greater)

See also 

Energy policy of India
Electricity in India
States of India by installed power capacity
List of largest power stations in the world

References 

 
India
Lists of buildings and structures in India
Economy of India lists